Canonical Transformation may refer to:

Symplectomorphism, a mathematical treatment
Canonical transformation, a physics treatment